Potassium-dependent sodium-calcium exchanger also known as solute carrier family 24 (SLC24) is a type of sodium-calcium exchanger that requires potassium to function.

Family members 

Human genes that encode members of the potassium-dependent sodium-calcium exchanger family include:

References

External links 
 

Solute carrier family